Malaysia competed in the 1993 Southeast Asian Games held in Singapore from 12 to 20 June 1993.

Medal summary

Medals by sport

Medallists

Football

Men's tournament
Group A

References

1993
Nations at the 1993 Southeast Asian Games